Evacuate the Dancefloor may refer to:

Evacuate the Dancefloor (album), 2009 album by Cascada
"Evacuate the Dancefloor" (song), song from the album